Centruroides elegans is a scorpion species in the genus Centruroides found in Mexico.

References

External links 
 Centruroides elegans photo on www.flickr.com
 Centruroides elegans at insectoid.info

elegans
Scorpions described in 1876
Endemic scorpions of Mexico